The Shrewsbury North West Relief Road is a planned  long single-carriageway bypass for Shrewsbury in England.

History 
The road has been discussed officially since the mid-1980s. Plans to introduce tolls to fund the road were explored, but dismissed in December 2007.

In 2019, the cost was stated to be £71 million. In April 2021, the cost was stated to be £84.3 million. £54 million is promised from national government funding with local government picking up the rest, including any overspend.

Route 
The road would connect the A5 in the west with the A5124 in the east, creating a complete ring road around Shrewsbury.

Reception 
Shropshire Council argues that the road will reduce congestion and unlock new land for housing. The scheme has received over 1,000 formal objections and has been criticised for being contradictory to the council's net zero by 2030 pledge.

The project has been criticised by climate activists for its environmental impact. They claim the road will require at least 29 trees to be felled including one which is over 550 years old.

See also
List of road projects in the UK

References 

Proposed roads in the United Kingdom
Transport in Shropshire